Herre may refer to:

Places
Herré, a town in the Landes department, France
Herre, Norway, a small town in Norway

People with the surname
Albert William Herre (1868–1962), American naturalist and taxonomist
Max Herre (b. 1973), German musician and member of the band Freundeskreis
 (1909–1997), German zoologist

Other uses
Herre (grape), another name for the French wine grape Fer
Gros Verdot, another French wine grape that is also known as Herre

See also
Hot In Herre, a 2002 rap song by Nelly